The Korea Federation for Environmental Movements (KFEM) is a non-profit organization in South Korea that focuses on environmentalism.

The group was founded in April 1993 as a federation of eight environmental groups, the largest being the Korean Anti-Pollution Movement Association. With approximately 80,000 individual members and around 50 local offices nationwide, KFEM is the largest environmental NGO in South Korea. Having roots in the Korean struggle for democracy, KFEM acts as a leader for the civil society. It is also the South Korean member of Friends of the Earth International.

Since its founding, the organization has achieved a number of important victories, including stopping harmful projects such as the proposed nuclear waste dump on Gureop Island, a dam construction on the Dong River, and a golf course in the Gaya Mountain National Park. KFEM seeks to raise awareness on a variety of environmental issues and offer a forum for the citizens' concerns. The main activities include campaigns, funding and initiating research projects, organizing protests, and leading nature conservation work. The major campaigns address nuclear energy and the transition to renewable energy, toxic chemicals and air pollution, river protection from large dam construction, wetland and water bird conservation, GMO's, and corporate social responsibility. Further, KFEM focuses on specific issues, such as the conservation of wetlands and biodiversity in the demilitarized zone (DMZ) between South and North Korea. KFEM also develops strategies for sustainable development and energy issues and plays a leading role in the international cooperation with regards to global environmental challenges.

Activities 

KFEM is nationally and internationally active and works on a variety of smaller and larger projects.

Conservation of the Demilitarized Zone and surrounding area 
The Demilitarized Zone (DMZ) is a buffer area between North and South Korea which was established after three years of the Korean War upon the signing of the Armistice Agreement on 27 July 1953. The DMZ is about 249 km long and 4 km wide.

Because of the limited human intervention in the DMZ and surrounding areas over the past 50 years, many wildlife species and plants have become established in the region, including endangered species like the black-faced spoonbill, red-crowned crane, and Amur goral. KFEM conducts research and field surveys to determine the ecological value of these areas, especially in terms of biodiversity.

River protection 
South Korea is ranked 7th in the world for the number of dams in the country, while the density of dams ranks first in the world. The country has 39,900 km of reinforced river banks and 129,844 km of water supply facilities (as of 2008).

KFEM works to improve the government's water and river related policies to be more environmentally-friendly. With a long history of protesting against large dam construction and other river development projects, such as the proposed Grand Canal project by the President Lee Myungbak. The project is one of the largest infrastructure projects in Korea's history that will create 553 km scar on the Korea landscape for 5,000 ton cargo ships to move between Seoul and Busan by linking the Han River and the Nakdong River.

Wetlands conservation 

Wetlands in Korea are important breeding, stopover, and wintering sites for a lot of endangered bird species, including the red-crowned, white-snapped and hooded cranes, black-faced spoonbills, and various migratory shorebirds. However, since 1990, more than 140,000 ha of coastal wetlands have been reclaimed, or are in the process of being claimed.
KFEM has been working to conserve those wetlands in the country and has successfully persuaded the Korean government to designate several wetlands as protected areas, including the Upo Wetland, a Ramsar Wetland of International Importance. KFEM conducts field surveys on important wetlands and uses scientific findings to improve government's wetland policies, while raising the public's awareness through various education exhibition, and eco-tourisim activities.

Environmental health 

KFEM's work to protect people from biological and chemical hazards includes campaigns to phase out the use of toxic chemicals such as asbestos in buildings and PVC plastic products, and monitoring indoor air quality of public places such as schools and subways. Researching bottled drinking water and iv bags in hospitals that and their impact on the environment and the human health belongs to the major activities. Further, the projects are concentrated on food and agricultural issues by supporting (organic) agriculture, while fighting against GMOs and chemical food and additives. The basic work is conducted through a variety of independent research to determine products' are safety for the human health and the ecosystem.

International cooperation 

As member of Friends of the Earth International (FoE), KFEM is part of a global network of environmental organizations in 74 countries. Among other projects, KFEM supports FoE's climate change campaign The Big Ask.

Since KFEM obtained the Special Consultative Status accreditation of the United Nations Economic and Social Council (ECOSOC) in May 1998, the organization has helped to promote the UN agenda within Korean society and has played a major role in promoting the UN's values. In collaboration with various environmental groups around the world, KFEM helps to raise global citizens' voices to protect Korean natural resources and ecosystems and global resources.

In the past, KFEM has been active in the desertification prevention in China Mongolia, to act against the increasing sandstorms that threaten the livelihoods of all peoples across Northeast Asia. Together with Chinese NGO, KFEM worked to protect and restore the grasslands of northern China by planting grass. Along with local residents, KFEM has planted 900 hectares of grassland in the alkali desertification zone of Northwest Jilin province from 2003 to 2007, and planted 200 hectares of grassland in Manduh Bulag within the northern part of Inner Mongolia in 2007.

In 2014, KFEM is carrying out an international project in the wetland areas of the Brazilian Amazon and supports the Korean city Suncheon in an exchange with the Brazilian city Curitiba (Citade Ecologica do Brazil).

Policy goals 

KFEM pursues a number of policy goals by seeking to, among others:
 create a world of sustainable consumption
 protect the environmental rights of biologically and socially vulnerable
 conserve natural ecosystems and build an ecologically friendly land use system in Korea
 reform laws and institutions to make the public sector more ecologically sound
 reorganize the industrial structure and taxation system to produce an ecologically sustainable economy
 work towards denuclearization, both in terms of weapons reduction and power generation solutions
 building an energy system based on renewable energy and work proactively to mitigate climate change
 achieve green local governance through grassroots civil society movements
 strengthen international cooperation and solidarity in order to protect the global environment

Organization 

There are six specialized organizations that are affiliated with KFEM:

Citizens' Information Center for Environment (CICE) 

The Citizens' Information Center for Environment (Information Center) originated from the Information Center of Korean Anti-Pollution Movement Association (KAPMA) in February 1991. It became one of six affiliated organizations of KFEM in February 1995. Managing the KFEM homepage, CICE aims to raise public awareness of environmental issues and suggests eco-friendly policies to society.

The major online campaigns of CICE are:
 protecting the endangered black-faced spoonbills in Asia Pacific
 reducing  through promoting bicycle use
 facilitating three-way sharing of environmental information among NGOs from China, Japan, and Korea  (enviroasia.info) [dead-link]
 reducing electronic waste in the Asia Pacific region
 establishing the Asia Pacific Alliance (APA) Korean website

Citizens' Institute for Environmental Studies (CIES) 

The Citizens' Institute for Environmental Studies (CIES) was founded in February  1993 to support a systematic and scientifically based professional environmental movement.

The major activities of CIEC are:
 devising a sustainable development plan with residents, researchers, and other NGOs
 conducting studies and research on how people's health is affected by environmental pollution and environmental health policy under the motto,  "When the environmental aches, the human body aches"
 studying energy efficiency and strategies for reducing  emissions
 issuing a weekly global newsletter and organizing a yearly citizens' environment workshop

Environmental Law Center (ELC) 

The Environmental Law Center has evolved over time. It started from the Environmental Law Counseling Center of the Korean Anti-Pollution Movement Association (KAPMA), the predecessor of KFEM, in April 1991. It then became the Legal Advise Office of KFEM in 1993. It was the Environmental Law Committee in 1997, before finally becoming an affiliated organization of KFEM on 21 February 2000. The center is the first environmental group in Korea to have a lawyer working as a full-time member of the staff. More than 100 lawyers participate in activities of the ELC as directors, steering committee, and members.

The major activities of the ELC are:

 supporting environment related lawsuits
 improving environment related laws and regulations
 legal advice to members
 legal consulting on environmental issues
 developing programs for lawyers and experts

ECO Cooperative 

The Eco Cooperative was started on 17 October 2002 to help address future environmental issues threatening health and living environment. The cooperative is working for an eco-friendly society where everyone can live in good health by respecting living things, and growing safe and healthy food. In order to supply safe food and build trust between producers and consumers, the Eco Cooperative promotes the development and sale of eco-friendly goods by enhancing their production and use. It sells products through an internet shopping site. Additionally, local cooperatives have been established at KFEM branches in local areas, such as KFEM's Seoul branch.

Korea Environmental Education Center (KEEC) 

The Korea Environmental Education Center (KEEC) was established in January 2000 to develop education programs for citizens at all levels. The KEEC is involved in diverse activities to systemize environment related education, and to help environmental group leaders and environmental activists learn the importance and necessity of environmental education.

The Major activities of KEEC are:

 researching on the systemization of environmental education
 developing and distributing education materials and tools
 developing and providing environmental programs for people of all ages and educators
 advising on effective environmental education development
 forming a network for environmental education
 evaluating environmental education related policies and recommending education policies

Monthly magazine Ham-ke-sa-neun-gil 

Hamkesaneungil means "The way to live together" in English. The magazine was first published in July 1993. The magazine contributes to raising environmental awareness in Korean society. The magazine focuses on environmental activities to promote coexistence of ecosystem and human beings, as well as social activities to construct a happy and healthy civil society.

See also 
 Green Party Korea

References

External links 
 Korea Federation for Environmental Movements 
 Korea Federation for Environmental Movements 환경운동연합 
 KFEM, Friends of the earth korea, is one of the national member of Friends of the Earth since 2002.

Environmental organizations based in South Korea